
Year 25 BC was either a common year starting on Wednesday, Thursday or Friday or a leap year starting on Wednesday or Thursday (link will display the full calendar) of the Julian calendar (the sources differ, see leap year error for further information) and a leap year starting on Tuesday of the Proleptic Julian calendar. At the time, it was known as the Year of the Consulship of Augustus and Silanus (or, less frequently, year 729 Ab urbe condita). The denomination 25 BC for this year has been used since the early medieval period, when the Anno Domini calendar era became the prevalent method in Europe for naming years.

Events 
 By place 

 Roman empire 
 Imperator Caesar Augustus becomes Consul for the ninth time. His partner is Marcus Junius Silanus.
 The temple to Neptune on the Circus Flaminius is built.
 Estimation: Rome, capital of the Roman Empire becomes the largest city in the world, taking the lead from Chang'an, capital of China.
Galatia becomes a Roman province after the death of its king. The Roman troops stationed there are relocated to Egypt.
The Roman colony of Emerita Augusta is founded (present-day Mérida).

 China 
 The government gives its tributary states 20,000 rolls of silk cloth and about 20,000 pounds of silk floss.

Births 
 Aulus Cornelius Celsus, author of De Medicina (d. c. AD 50)

Deaths 

 Amyntas of Galatia, King of Galatia

References